Robert Melville is an English car designer currently working as Design Director at McLaren Automotive. He previously worked with Jaguar Land Rover and General Motors.

Melville helped to design the Range Rover, Cadillac Converj, McLaren P1, McLaren 650S and was Chief Designer of the McLaren 675LT, McLaren 570S/570GT, McLaren GT and McLaren 720S.

Early life 
Melville is the youngest of three boys. His father was an engineer and mother an artist. Robert enjoyed spending his time studying and sketching nature and different vehicles. Graduating from Benton Park in 1996, He then went to Leeds college of art and design. He graduated from The University of Huddersfield in 2001 with a 1st in BA (Hons) Vehicle Design, he then went on to study a Master in Automotive Design at the Royal College of Art in London.

Career 
In 2003, Melville joined the Jaguar Land Rover Advanced Design team, where he helped design the Range Rover Evoque. In 2006, he joined General Motors in the UK as Senior Creative Designer. Here, he helped with designs for the Cadillac Converj, Chevrolet Corvette, Hummer, and Buick.

In 2009, he was recruited by McLaren CEO Antony Sheriff, and became the Senior Designer for McLaren Automotive. He was promoted to Chief Designer in 2015, at the age of 37. He designed the McLaren 570S, 570GT & 570S Spider before designing the McLaren 720S, which debuted in 2017. The 720S, designed by Melville, represents a departure from McLaren's classic design style. The traditional side air takes have been removed in exchange for smooth side panels. The dihedral doors include built-in air channels which direct air to the engine. "Every profile, every curve on this car has been designed for maximum driver engagement," says Melville about the 720S.

In May, 2017, Melville was promoted to McLaren Director of Design, replacing Frank Stephenson. 

As McLaren Director of Design Melville has led the design of some of McLaren’s most iconic designs such as the McLaren Senna, McLaren Speedtail, McLaren Elva   and the 765LT  . Melville is also responsible for design collaborations with brands such as Belstaff  and Richard Mille.

References 

McLaren people
Living people
British automobile designers
Year of birth missing (living people)